Events from the year 1271 in Ireland.

Incumbent
Lord: Henry III

Events

Deaths
 28 July: Walter de Burgo (b. c 1230) died in Galway and was buried in Athassel Priory
 Maine Mor Ó Cellaigh, King of Uí Maine and 10th Chief of the Name

References

 
1270s in Ireland
Ireland
Years of the 13th century in Ireland